Vania King and Yaroslava Shvedova were the defending champions, but King decided not to participate. Shvedova played alongside Katarina Srebotnik, but they lost in the semifinals to Ekaterina Makarova and Elena Vesnina.
Makarova and Vesnina won the final 6–3, 1–6, [10–8] against Maria Kirilenko and Nadia Petrova.

Seeds

Draw

Draw

References
 Main Draw

2012 Women's Doubles
Kremlin Cup - Doubles